Richard of Staines (or Richard de Stanes) was an English clerical judge. He acted as an Itinerant Justice, visiting 11 counties in 1208 before his appointment as a justice of the Court of King's Bench in 1209. He became Lord Chief Justice in 1269, and after the coronation of Edward I in 1273 was moved to the Court of Common Pleas. He died in 1277.

References

1277 deaths
Justices of the Common Pleas
Lord chief justices of England and Wales
Justices of the King's Bench
13th-century English people
Year of birth unknown